Nogi Station is the name of two train stations in Japan:

 Nogi Station (Shimane) (乃木駅)
 Nogi Station (Tochigi) (野木駅)